Cichorium spinosum, the spiny chicory, is a species of flowering plant in the family Asteraceae, native to the Mediterranean region. A biennial or perennial reaching , is both collected in the wild and cultivated as a leafy green vegetable.

References

Cichorieae
Flora of Spain
Flora of Italy
Flora of Sicily
Flora of Libya
Flora of Greece
Flora of Crete
Flora of the East Aegean Islands
Flora of Turkey
Flora of Cyprus
Plants described in 1753
Taxa named by Carl Linnaeus